Bluewater is a census-designated place (CDP) in San Bernardino County, California, United States. The population was 172 at the 2010 census, down from 265 at the 2000 census.

Geography
Bluewater is located at  (34.180214, -114.250531).

Climate
This area has a large amount of sunshine year round due to its stable descending air and high pressure.  According to the Köppen Climate Classification system, Bluewater has a desert climate, abbreviated "Bwh" on climate maps.

Demographics

2010
At the 2010 census Bluewater had a population of 172. The racial makeup of Bluewater was 156 (90.7%) White (89.5% Non-Hispanic White), 2 (1.2%) African American, 1 (0.6%) Native American, 0 (0.0%) Asian, 1 (0.6%) Pacific Islander, 9 (5.2%) from other races, and 3 (1.7%) from two or more races. Hispanic or Latino of any race were 11 people (6.4%).

The whole population lived in households, no one lived in non-institutionalized group quarters and no one was institutionalized.

There were 112 households, 5 (4.5%) had children under the age of 18 living in them, 36 (32.1%) were opposite-sex married couples living together, 4 (3.6%) had a female householder with no husband present, 3 (2.7%) had a male householder with no wife present.  There were 6 (5.4%) unmarried opposite-sex partnerships, and 0 (0%) same-sex married couples or partnerships. 61 households (54.5%) were one person and 41 (36.6%) had someone living alone who was 65 or older. The average household size was 1.54.  There were 43 families (38.4% of households); the average family size was 2.12.

The age distribution was 8 people (4.7%) under the age of 18, 1 people (0.6%) aged 18 to 24, 9 people (5.2%) aged 25 to 44, 47 people (27.3%) aged 45 to 64, and 107 people (62.2%) who were 65 or older.  The median age was 70.4 years. For every 100 females, there were 107.2 males.  For every 100 females age 18 and over, there were 102.5 males.

There were 592 housing units at an average density of 440.8 per square mile, of the occupied units 104 (92.9%) were owner-occupied and 8 (7.1%) were rented. The homeowner vacancy rate was 9.6%; the rental vacancy rate was 42.9%.  158 people (91.9% of the population) lived in owner-occupied housing units and 14 people (8.1%) lived in rental housing units.

According to the 2010 United States Census, Bluewater had a median household income of $37,875, with 4.1% of the population living below the federal poverty line.

2000
At the 2000 census there were 265 people, 158 households, and 85 families in the CDP. The population density was 290.4 inhabitants per square mile (112.4/km). The racial makeup of the CDP was 98.1% White, 0.4% African American, 0.4% Native American, 1.1% from other races. Hispanic or Latino of any race were 1.5%.

Of the 158 households 5.7% had children under the age of 18 living with them, 48.7% were married couples living together, 3.8% had a female householder with no husband present, and 45.6% were non-families. 41.8% of households were one person and 29.1% were one person aged 65 or older.  The average household size was 1.68 and the average family size was 2.16.

The age distribution was 7.2% under the age of 18, 8.7% from 25 to 44, 27.5% from 45 to 64, and 56.6% 65 or older.  The median age was 67 years. For every 100 females, there were 96.3 males.  For every 100 females age 18 and over, there were 95.2 males.

The median household income was $18,750 and the median family income  was $25,000. Males had a median income of $27,083 versus $17,250 for females. The per capita income for the CDP was $15,142.  About 21.0% of families and 18.6% of the population were below the poverty line, including 73.3% of those under the age of eighteen and 2.8% of those sixty five or over.

Government

References

Census-designated places in San Bernardino County, California
Communities in the Lower Colorado River Valley
Census-designated places in California
California populated places on the Colorado River